Ernst Wahlberg (15 October 1904 – 1 May 1977) was a Swedish footballer. He made one appearance for the Swedish national team.

References

Swedish footballers
Djurgårdens IF Fotboll players
AIK Fotboll players
1904 births
1977 deaths
Association footballers not categorized by position